Alexandra Byrne (born 1962) is an English costume designer. Much of her career has focused on creating costumes for period dramas. These films include Persuasion (1995), Hamlet (1996), Elizabeth (1998), Finding Neverland (2004), The Phantom of the Opera (2004), Elizabeth: The Golden Age (2007), Mary Queen of Scots (2018), The Aeronauts (2019), and Emma. (2020). Byrne's costume design work has earned her six Oscar nominations, and she won the award for Elizabeth: The Golden Age.

Since 2011, Byrne has also designed the costumes for many films in the Marvel Cinematic Universe, including Thor (2011), The Avengers (2012), Guardians of the Galaxy (2014), Avengers: Age of Ultron (2015), and Doctor Strange (2016).

Life and career

Early life
Byrne was born in Hampshire, and grew up amidst many artistic influences. She was raised in Stratford-upon-Avon, where the Royal Shakespeare Company is based. She would later tell an interviewer that her career in theatre design was predestined, and she began by studying architecture with the intention of building sets in theatre. She encountered costume design when studying theatre design with the English National Opera. She later said, "I worked in the theatre for quite a few years, doing costume and set design. In England, it's very much both." She also trained with the Motley Theatre Design Course.

Byrne oversaw scenery and costumes for the 1989 comedy play Some Americans Abroad. Her work earned her a Tony Award nomination for Best Scenic Design. Despite her success, she was unsure if she would focus on set design or costume design. She decided on the latter when she was working on a television project for the BBC's Shakespeare series. Byrne said, "I was assisting a costume designer who was fantastic with fabric. It was with her that I actually thought, 'This is what it's all about. This is what I want to do'".

In 1993, Byrne created the costumes for all four parts of the TV serial The Buddha of Suburbia starring Naveen Andrews. For her costume work in the production, she received a nomination at the British Academy Television Awards.

Period films (1995–2007)
Byrne's first encounter with period costume dramas began when she was hired to create the costumes for the BBC film Persuasion. The production was an adaptation of the novel of the same name by Jane Austen, and featured Amanda Root as Anne Elliot. Byrne had also worked with the film's director, Roger Michell, on Some Americans Abroad and The Buddha of Suburbia. For her work in Persuasion, Byrne won the British Academy Television Award for Costume Design. The following year, Byrne created the costumes for the 1996 film Hamlet directed by and starring Kenneth Branagh, with whom she had previously worked on Life of Napoleon. She received her first Academy Award nomination for Best Costume Design.

In 1998, Byrne served as the costume designer for the feature film Elizabeth, which starred Cate Blanchett as the last Tudor monarch. It featured high production values despite a limited budget. Director Shekhar Kapur discouraged historical research on Byrne's part, instead favouring clothing that focused on emotion. As a result, Byrne primarily designed costumes emphasising the theatrical rather than the historically accurate. When analysing the film, the scholar Bethany Latham stated that the production's silhouettes were "understated and barely Elizabethan," as they were not meant to distract from the film's plot among viewers. For Elizabeth, Byrne earned her second Academy Award nomination for Best Costume Design. 

Byrne oversaw the costumes for the 2004 film Finding Neverland starring Johnny Depp and Kate Winslet. After completing it, Byrne said that when she worked on "a period film, however conceptual a piece it is, I research the period completely so that I absolutely know it. There were photographs from the first production of Peter Pan and of the Llewelyn Davies family". That year, Daily Variety reported that Byrne's "previous two Oscar noms make her a known commodity", and she again garnered a nomination for Best Costume Design at the Academy Awards.

Also in 2004, Byrne designed the costumes for the film The Phantom of the Opera. As research, she studied relics of the era such as paintings and original clothing. Her visits to Paris also gave her inspiration. As her ideas developed and were discussed with the filmmakers, they were placed on a "mood board" of visuals for her to reference. She eventually created 300 original costumes for the main characters, and produced at least 2,000 additional costumes for those in the background.

In 2007, Byrne designed the costumes for Elizabeths sequel Elizabeth: The Golden Age, also starring Blanchett. As the sequel was set 27 years later, Byrne sought to create costumes for a confident queen "who has found her stride and established her style". Kapur did not feel Elizabeth: The Golden Age had to be historically accurate, giving Byrne the freedom to make his film "look very different, much lighter, with a more feminine court". For her costume design work in the film, Byrne was again nominated for the Academy Award, this time winning.

Marvel films (2011–2016)
Since 2011, much of Byrne's career has focused on films in the Marvel Cinematic Universe. Her first contribution to the franchise, Thor (2011), resulted when she was hired by the film's director, Kenneth Branagh. She had also worked with Branagh on previous productions such as Hamlet (1996) and Sleuth (2007). Byrne took inspiration from the Thor comics and the artwork of Jack Kirby, which she described as "amazing". She later said that for Thor's character, "it's all about his arms". After Thor, Byrne's next Marvel project was the 2012 film The Avengers, where she oversaw a team of over 60 people.

She followed The Avengers with Guardians of the Galaxy in 2014, which she described as having a "very retro, pulpy feel". As with Thor, Byrne found much of her inspiration from the comics. The production's main actor, Chris Pratt, was hired before he had lost enough body weight, forcing Byrne to anticipate what his physical form would become. When describing Pratt's character Star-Lord in Guardians of the Galaxy, Byrne said he "was all about the swagger, but without vanity" and designed a red jacket for him that was heavily treated cotton, though it looked like real leather. Her next project, Avengers: Age of Ultron, arrived in cinemas in May 2015.

Byrne is the costume designer for the 2016 Marvel film Doctor Strange starring Benedict Cumberbatch, which began shooting in November 2015 at Pinewood-Shepperton studios in the UK. For Strange's famous Cloak of Levitation, Byrne estimated that twelve different versions were completed by a team of designers. She sought to incorporate subtle details while avoiding making it "over-embellish[ed] and decorative".

Personal life

Byrne married English actor Simon Shepherd in 1980.

Filmography

Awards and nominations

Notes

References

Works cited

External links

BAFTA winners (people)
Best Costume Design Academy Award winners
Living people
British costume designers
Women costume designers
People from Stratford-upon-Avon
1962 births